Marie Rita Marcelle Lagesse O.S.K (February 7, 1916 – March 8, 2011) was a Mauritian journalist and writer. 

She was born in Quatre Bornes and married Gaston Lagesse at a young age. After she was widowed, she went to the Salomon Islands where her father was administrator, living there from 1938 until 1942, when she returned to Mauritius. In 1945, she published a collection of short stories Les contes du samedi under the pseudonym Rita Marc. In 1958, she published her first novel La Diligence s'éloigne à l'aube; it was awarded the Robert Bargues prize.

From 1942 to 1950, she contributed to Savez vous que?, the official publication of the Mauritius Public Relations Office. Lagesse was also writing for the three Mauritian daily newspapers Le Cernéen, Le Mauricien and Advance. From 1961 to 1971, she wrote a weekly column for the newspaper Action. Lagesse retired from journalism in 1987.

Her novels were translated into Russian and English. Lagesse wrote several plays, including a radio play for the Office de Radiodiffusion Télévision Française, Villebague. She also researched the history of Mauritius, publishing the results through Editions des Archives de lîle Maurice.

She was named an Officer in the Ordre des Palmes Académiques and a Chevalier in the National Order of Merit. In 1981, she was given French citizenship by decree. She was elevated to the rank of Officer of the Order of the Star and Key of the Indian Ocean (O.S.K) in 2015.

She died at the age of 95 following an extended illness.

 Selected works Les contes du samedi, short stories (1945)La diligence s'éloigne à l'aube, novel (1958), received the Prix Robert BarguesLe vingt Floréal au matin, novel (1960)Villebague, novel
 Cette maison pleine de fantômes’', novel (1962)
D'un Carnet, novel
A la découverte de l'Ile Maurice, Historical (1970)
 Sont amis que vent emporte, novel (1974), received the Prix des Mascareignes
Des pas sur le sable, novel (1975)
Villebague, novel
Une lanterne au mat d'artimon, novel
L'Ile de France avant La Bourdonnais, Historical
L'Hôtel du Gouvernement, Historical
Blyth Brothers & Co. Ltd. Historical
Maurice vue du ciel
150 ans de jeunesse, Histoire de la Mauritius Commercial Bank, Historic
 Une jeune femme au Mont Limon, novel (1993)
Les Palmiers de la Source, Theatre
Comme un feu de Proue, Theatre
L'Amour à travers les âges, Theatre
Un homme parmi les autres, Theatre
Chantons la liberté,Theatre
Villebague, Theatre
Carolyne, Theatre

References 

1916 births
2011 deaths
Mauritian journalists
Mauritian women journalists
Mauritian novelists
Mauritian dramatists and playwrights
Mauritian non-fiction writers
Officiers of the Ordre des Palmes Académiques
Knights of the Ordre national du Mérite
20th-century novelists
20th-century dramatists and playwrights
20th-century Mauritian writers
Mauritian women novelists
20th-century women writers